Marin Čilić was the defending champion, but lost in the second round to Diego Schwartzman.

Feliciano López won the title for the second time in three years, defeating Gilles Simon in the final, 6–2, 6–7(4–7), 7–6(7–2).

Seeds

Draw

Finals

Top half

Bottom half

Qualifying

Seeds

Qualifiers

Lucky loser
  Roberto Carballés Baena

Qualifying draw

First qualifier

Second qualifier

Third qualifier

Fourth qualifier

References

Main draw
Qualifying draw

Singles